Visa requirements for Beninese citizens are administrative entry restrictions by the authorities of other states placed on citizens of Benin. As of 2 July 2019, Beninese citizens had visa-free or visa on arrival access to 61 countries and territories, ranking the Beninese passport 83rd in terms of travel freedom (tied with a passport from Morocco) according to the Henley Passport Index.

Visa requirements map

Israel is visa free.

Visa requirements

Dependent, disputed, or restricted territories
Unrecognized or partially recognized countries

Dependent and autonomous territories

Non-visa restrictions

See also

Visa policy of Benin
ECOWAS passport

References and Notes
References

Notes

Benin
Foreign relations of Benin